This is a list of software titles produced for the Sinclair QL personal computer.

Notation: Program name (purpose), publisher, first release

Utilities

# 
 3D Precision, High-Precision Imaging System, Digital Precision

A 
 Abacus (Spreadsheet), Psion (Sinclair), 1984
 APL Interpreter
 ArcED, coWo
 Archive (Database), Psion (Sinclair), 1984
 Archivist database (Std and MP), A.R.K. (Richard Howe), 1984
 Assembler and Linker, Computer One
 Assembler, GST Computer Systems
 Assembler, Metacomco
 Assembler Workbench, Talent

B 
 Banks of Plants, Toby Hodd, 1986
 BASIC TO CPORT, Translator from SuperBASIC to Kernighan & Ritchie C, Digital Precision
 BCPL Compiler, Metacomco
 Beule Tools, Peter Beule

C 
 C Compiler (Small C), GST
 C Compiler (Lattice C), Metacomco c68
 Cad Pak, Datalink
 Cardfile database (128K and 256K), A.R.K. (Richard Howe), 1986
 Cartridge Doctor, Talent
 Cosmos, Talent
 CST Disk Utilities (Backup, Convert, Filed, Disced, Ramdrive), Cambridge Systems Technology

D 
 Data Design (Database), The Progs
 Desktop Publisher, Digital Precision
 Desktop Publisher Special Edition, Digital Precision
 Digital C (Small C), Digital Precision
 Digital C Special Edition (~~K&R C), Digital Precision
 DISA (Intelligent Disassembler), JO
 Disk Mate 5, PM data (Pål Monstad)
 Disktool & Quickdisk, Ultrasoft (Martin Berndt)
 DJ Toolkit (DJTK)

E 
 Easel (Business Graphics), Psion (Sinclair), 1984
 EasyPTR, Albin Hessler
 Eye-Q, Graphics System, Digital Precision
 Eye-Q Special Edition, Graphics System, Digital Precision

F 
 Ferret (File Search Utility), Sector Software
 Fibu (Accounting), eTo soft
 Flashback (Database), Sector Software
 Forth, Computer One
 Fortran 77, Prospero
 Front Page, (Desktop Publisher), GAP Software

G 
 Giga-BASIC, Giga-Soft (ABC Electronic)
 Giga-Chroma, Giga-Soft (ABC Electronic)
 Giga-Disassembler with Monitor, Giga-Soft (ABC Electronic)
 Grafix III, Digital Precision
 Graphics Toolkit, Ultrasoft (Martin Berndt)
 GraphiQL, Talent
 GST Assembler

I 
 Ice Toolkit, Eidersoft (on eprom)
 IDIS (Intelligent disassembler), Digital Precision
 IDIS Special Edition (Intelligent disassembler), Digital Precision
 Image D, PDQL

L 
 Librarian database (128K and 256K), A.R.K. (Richard Howe), 1986
 Lightning, Text/Graphics/Maths Accelerator, Digital Precision
 Lightning Special Edition, Digital Precision
 Lisp Interpreter, Metacomco

M 
 Macro Assembler, GST
 Mailfile database (128K and 256K), A.R.K. (Richard Howe), 1986
 Mailmerge, A.R.K. (Richard Howe), 1986
 Master Spy editor, A.R.K. (Richard Howe), 1988
 Media Manager md/fdd editor and repair tools, Digital Precision, 1986
 Mega Dictionary for Perfection, 360K word Spellchecker, Digital Precision
 Menu Extension, JMS
 M-Paint, Medic
 Monitor, Computer One
 Mon QL, Hisoft

N 
 Nucleon, Pyramide

P 
 Page Designer, Sector Software
 Page Designer 2, Sector Software
 Page Designer 3, Sector Software
 Paint Master, Shadow Games
 Pascal Compiler, Computer One
 Pascal (ISO 7185/ANSI 770×3.97), Prospero
 PC Conqueror (IBM PC emulator, supports MS-DOS v.3,4,5,6), Digital Precision
 PCB1, Talent
 PCB CAD, Lear Data Systems
 Peintre, Pyramide
 Perfect Pointer Tools, Digital Precision
 Perfection, Word Processor, Digital Precision
 Perfection Special Edition, Word Processor, Digital Precision
 Pointer's & Writer's Toolkit, JMS
 Professional Monitor, Compware
 Professional Publisher, Digital Precision

Q 

 QD, JMS
 Q-Draw, Psion, 1985
 QKick, Ultrasoft (Martin Berndt)
 QMATHS, Digital Precision
 QMATHS II, Digital Precision
 QMon, QJump
 QLOAD (SuperBASIC fast save/load), Liberation
 QL Cadette drafting system, Bestmalt Ltd (Mark Mansell), 1987
 QL Cash Trader (Cash Accounting Package), RWAP Software
 QL Cosmos (Astronomy Program), Talent available from RWAP Software (Programmer: G. F. Cornwell)
 QL Gardener, GCS (Sinclair)
 QL ICE, Eidersoft
 QL Paint (an edition of GraphiQL), Talent (Sinclair)
 QL Pascal Development Kit, Metacomco, 1985
 QL Payroll
 QL Project Planner, Triptych Publishing Ltd, 1985 - (PCM)
 QL Super Monitor, Digital Precision
 QL Toolbox, Ultrasoft (Martin Berndt)
 QLiberator Basic Compiler, Liberation
 QLone+, Ultrasoft (Martin Berndt)
 QPAC, QJump
 QPAC 2, QJump
 QPTR, QJump
 QRAM, QJump
 QREF (SuperBASIC Cross Reference), Liberation
 QTop (Desk, clock, demos, animator, index, snap), coWo, 1989
 QTYP, QJump
 Quick Layout, Gollmann
 Quill (Word processor), Psion, (Sinclair), 1984
 QZ II, Sector Software

R 
 RPM Resident Procedure Manager, Liberation

S 
 S-Edit, Ralf Reköndt/Ultrasoft (Martin Berndt)
 Sideways
 Spellbound Interactive Spelling Checker, Sector Software, 1987
 Spy editor, A.R.K. (Richard Howe), 1988
 SToQL
 Stripper file filter, A.R.K. (Richard Howe), 1986
 Super Astrologer, Digital Precision (Elmar Dunsser), 1985
 SuperBASIC Extension, Hisoft
 SuperCharge SuperBASIC compiler with Lenslok, Digital Precision
 SuperCharge Special Edition, Digital Precision
 SuperForth, (with Reversi/Othello game), Digital Precision
 Super Media Manager, Digital Precision
 Super Sprite Generator, Digital Precision
 SuperToolkit II, QJump (Care)
 SuperToolkit III, Ultrasoft (Martin Berndt)

T 
 Task Master (Multitasking front end), Sector Software, 1987
 TechniQL (CAD software), Talent
 Text87 plus4 (Word processor), Software87
 The Painter by The Progs, 1988/1990
 Thing & EPROM Manager, JMS
 Thor-Desk, coWo, 1988
 Toolkit III, Ultrasoft (Martin Berndt)
 Touch Typist (Typing tutor), Sector Software, 1985
 Transfer Utility, Digital Precision
 TURBO (SuperBASIC compiler), Digital Precision, 1987
 TURBO TOOLKIT, Digital Precision, 1987

U 
 USCD Fortran-77, TDI
 USCD Pascal, TDI
 USCD Toolkit, TDI

X 
 XCHANGE (Office), Psion (Cambridge Systems Technology)

Z 
 Zapper, Eidersoft
 Z88 Transfer, Mark Pfizenmazer

Games

# 
 3D Slime

A 
 Assault & Battery, Kaos Software
 Arcanoid
 Alien Hijack, Chisoft - On QL Wiki

B 
 BJ in 3D Land, Eidersoft - On QL Wiki
 BJ Returns, Eidersoft - On QL Wiki
 Black Knight (Chess), JMS
 Blocklands Warrior, Digital Precision
 Brain Smasher, JMS
 Breakout

C 
 Cavern
 Chess, Psion (Sinclair)
 Citadel, Eidersoft - on QL Wiki
 Crazy Painter, Microdeal

D 
 Deathstrike
 Diamonds, JMS
 Double Block (Tetris-style game), CGH
 Dragonhold
 Dreamlands, CGH Services
 Droidzone
 D-Day, CGH

E 
 Eagle, Eidersoft
 Executive Adventure, Gemini

F 
 Fleet Tactical Command, DI-REN
 Flightdeck, Deltasoft
 Flight Simulator, Ekotek
 Funfear, Talent - Never released (Author: Mert)

H 
 Horrorday
 Hyperdrive

J 
 Jungle Eddi

K 
 Karate, Eidersoft
 Knight Flight, Realtime Software

L 

 Lands of Havoc
 Lost Kingdom of Zkul
 Lost Pharaoh

M 
 Matchpoint, Psion - on QL Wiki
 Metropolis, Medic Datasystems - on QL Wiki
 MicroBridge, Contract Bridge player, Digital Precision
 Mortville Manor, Pyramide
 M-Cosmic, Medic Datasystems - on QL Wiki
 M-Crunch, Medic Datasystems - on QL Wiki
 M-Treasure, Medic Datasystems - on QL Wiki

N 
 Nebula II, Pyramide
 Nemesis MKII, RWAP Software

O 
 Othello, Pyramide
 Oxford Trivia

P 
 Pengi, RWAP Software - on QL Wiki
 Pirate
 QL Pawn, Magnetic Scrolls - on QL Wiki
 The Prawn RWAP Software (Author: Mert) - on QL Wiki

Q 

 QBert
 QL Adventure, Optimus Software
 QL Bounder, Brian Kelly - on QL Wiki
 QL Fantasy (World 2000, Golf Plus, Fireball Plus, Satellites, Marine, Leonardo, Amadeus, Q-Prints), RB Software, 1986
 QL Fictionary
 QL Jabber, Sinclair (programmer: Arrakis)
 QL Monopoly
 QL Quboids, Sinclair (programmer: AJS)
 QShang, Stefan Kühne
 QWord, RWAP Software (programmer: Rich Mellor, Geoff Wicks and Phoebus Dokos)

R 
 Return to Eden (CGH Services)
 Reversi

S 
 Scrabble
 Spook, Eidersoft (Programmer: Damon Chaplin) - on QL Wiki
 Speedfreaks, Kaos Software
 Super Arcadia (BMX Burner and Grid Racer), Digital Precision
 SuperGames Pack (Arcanoid II, Pengi, Firebirds, Ion Gold, Doppel Ion), JMS

T 
 The Talisman
 Tankbusters
 The Heart of Gern  Text adventure by P.C.B.S. (1987)
 Type 22, Type 22 frigate simulator by John G. Burns for Talent Software

V 
 Vroom, Pyramide

W 
 War in the East
 West, Talent
 Wanderer, Pyramide

Home computer software
Lists of software
Sinclair QL